The 1905–06 United States collegiate men's ice hockey season was the 12th season of collegiate ice hockey.

Due to a lack of success and home ice facility, Brown suspended its ice hockey team after the season. It would be another 20 years before Brown would field another team.

Regular season

Standings

References

1905–06 NCAA Standings

External links
College Hockey Historical Archives

 
College